WCZS-LD, virtual channel 35 (UHF digital channel 30), is a low-power religious independent television station that is licensed to Shippensburg, Pennsylvania. A longtime Cornerstone Television station previously licensed to Harrisburg, WCZS-LD (as W07DP-D) was sold to Sonshine Family Television in 2018. In 2020 the station changed its city of license to Shippensburg and obtained a construction permit to move its transmitter to Clarks Knob, near its new city of license.

The station signed on UHF analog channel 35 on August 29, 1986 as W40AF; then on December 8, 2003 as W35BT; on August 21, 2009 as W07DP-D; and on 2020 as WCZS-LD.

Digital television

Digital channels
The station's digital signal is multiplexed:

Analog-to-digital conversion
W07DP-D (as W35BT) shut down its analog signal, over UHF channel 35, on June 12, 2009, the official date in which full-power television stations in the United States transitioned from analog to digital broadcasts under federal mandate. The station's digital signal began on its pre-transition VHF channel 7. Through the use of PSIP, digital television receivers display the station's virtual channel as its former UHF analog channel 35.

References

External links
Cornerstone TeleVision official site

CZS-LD
York County, Pennsylvania
Television channels and stations established in 1986
Low-power television stations in the United States